ASL is a common initialism for American Sign Language, the sign language of the United States and Canada (not be confused with Auslan, also called ASL or Asilulu language which has the ISO code ASL), and may also refer to:

Culture

Sport 
 American Soccer League (disambiguation)
 Australia's Surfing Life, surf magazine
 African Super League, a future CAF club competition 
 Axpo Super League, former name of the Swiss Super League

Other uses 
 A Static Lullaby, American post-hardcore band
 Advanced Squad Leader, a tactical board wargame
 A shorted version of the following slang terms:
 age/sex/location, internet slang
 As hell, slang popular amongst members of Generation Z
 Average shot length, in film editing
 AfreecaTV StarCraft League, a video game tournament series

Science and technology

Aviation
 Aeronautical Syndicate Ltd, British aeroplane manufacturer.
 Air Serbia, ICAO airline code
 ASL Airlines Ireland, cargo airline

Biology and medicine 
 American Society of Lymphology, former name of the Lymphology Association of North America
 Argininosuccinate lyase, an enzyme
 Arterial spin labelling, a perfusion MRI technique

Computing 
 ACPI Source Language, for ACPI tables
 Adobe Source Libraries, open-source GUI software libraries
 Advanced Simulation Library, open-source hardware-accelerated multiphysics simulation software
 AMPL Solver Library, an open-source automatic differentiation library
 Apache Software License, an open-source license for software
 Application Services Library, a process model for the maintenance of software applications
 Arithmetic shift left, an operation implementing an arithmetic shift

Other uses 
 Above sea level, an altitude measurement
 Association for Symbolic Logic, of specialists in mathematical logic and philosophical logic
 Automated side loader, type of garbage collection truck
Atmospheric Sciences Laboratory, a research institution formerly under the U.S. Army Materiel Command

Society

Education 
 The American School in London
 Appalachian School of Law, Grundy, Virginia
 Art Students' League of Philadelphia

Other uses 
 Anti-Saloon League, an organization of temperance movements that lobbied for prohibition in the United States.
Advanced stop line, a road marking at junctions
 Artists' Suffrage League, UK
 Autobacs Sportscar Laboratory, of Autobacs Seven, Japan
 Ansar al-Sharia in Libya, a Salafist Islamist militia group
 Animelo Summer Live, a Japanese music festival